Benjamin M. Garcia, also known as Ben Tumbling (7 June 1957 – 13 March 1981) was a Filipino gangster and one of the most notorious criminals in the Philippines.

Life 
A resident of Malabon, he derived his nickname Ben Tumbling from his job before as a stuntman. His skill later helped him to evade policemen trying to arrest him.

His hatred with police was said to be started when he experienced torture from the hands of the police during his younger years after he was charged of a crime allegedly he didn't commit. However, reports stated that it was intensified when some of the policemen raped his wife.

His involvement in crimes such as robbery, carjacking and drug trafficking, and the killings of 7 policemen by personal motives within months, led to the police to tag him in their wanted list. Being a subject by manhunt operations by the Philippine Constabulary for about a year, he was once caught by the forces from the then Western Police District led by Lt. Ernesto Diokno.

He achieved his popularity, especially from the poor locals who shared his profits from his criminal activities, the reason why he was regarded as a hero. It was evident when thousands of them attended his wake after his death in an ambush by the police operatives led by then Intelligence Chief Col. Vicente Vinarao in a Friday of 1981 in Malabon.

In popular culture
Portrayed by Lito Lapid in a 1985 film, Ben Tumbling: A People's Journal Story.
Portrayed by Ace Espinosa in a 1997 film by Viva Films, Boy Chico, Hulihin si Ben Tumbling.
Another life story about him was featured in a 2012 film, Alyas Ben Tumbling.
Featured in History With Lourd (2014, News 5).

References

1981 deaths
1957 births
20th-century criminals
Filipino criminals
Filipino gangsters
Filipino murderers
Filipino serial killers
Gang members
Male serial killers
People from Malabon
People shot dead by law enforcement officers